The Philippine House Committee on Agrarian Reform, or House Agrarian Reform Committee is a standing committee of the Philippine House of Representatives.

Jurisdiction 
As prescribed by House Rules, the committee's jurisdiction includes the following:
 Agrarian reform
 Implementation and amendment of the Comprehensive Agrarian Reform Law
 Resettlement of and other support services for agrarian reform beneficiaries

Members, 18th Congress

Historical members

18th Congress

Vice Chairperson 
 Nestor Fongwan (Benguet–Lone, PDP–Laban)

Member for the Majority 
 Rodolfo Albano (LPGMA)

See also 
 House of Representatives of the Philippines
 List of Philippine House of Representatives committees
 Department of Agrarian Reform
 Comprehensive Agrarian Reform Program

Notes

References

External links 
House of Representatives of the Philippines

Agrarian Reform